Sveriges mästerkock is a Swedish competitive reality television cooking show based on the original British version of MasterChef. The first episode aired on 12 January 2011 on TV4.

Judges
The competition judges are Leif Mannerström, Markus Aujalay, Per Morberg 2011–2013, Anders Dahlbom 2014 and Mischa Billing 2015-.

1st season

Top 14

Elimination table

References

External links
 
 

MasterChef
Swedish reality television series
TV4 (Sweden) original programming
2011 Swedish television series debuts
Swedish television series based on British television series